The Cal 39 (Hunt/O'Day) is an American sailboat that was designed by C. Raymond Hunt and Associates as a racer-cruiser and first built in 1988.

The design was originally marketed by the manufacturer as the Cal 39, but is now usually referred to as the Cal 39 (Hunt/O'Day) to differentiate it from the earlier unrelated C. William Lapworth-designs: the 1970 Cal 39, the 1978 Cal 39 Mark II and 1983 Cal 39 Mark III, which were all marketed under the same Cal 39 name.

Production
The design was built by Jensen Marine/Cal Boats and the O'Day Corp. in the United States, both divisions of the Bangor Punta conglomerate. In 2001 George Crowell bought the molds for the design and built a limited number of boats in Little Compton, Rhode Island.

Design
The Cal 39 (Hunt/O'Day) is a recreational keelboat, built predominantly of fiberglass, with wooden trim. It has a masthead sloop rig, a raked stem, a reverse transom with a cut-out for a ladder and swimming platform, a spade-type rudder controlled by a wheel and a fixed fin keel. It displaces  and carries  of ballast.

The boat is fitted with a  Japanese Yanmar diesel  inboard engine for docking and maneuvering.

The design has sleeping accommodation for six people, with a bow cabin with a "V"-berth, a "U"-shaped dinette table berth and settee berth and an aft cabin on the starboard side, under the cockpit. The head is located on the port side at the foot of the companionway steps, opposite the galley. The gallery includes a three-burner stove, double sinks and an icebox.

See also
List of sailing boat types

Similar sailboats
Baltic 40
Cal 39
Cal 39 Mark II
Corbin 39
Freedom 39
Freedom 39 PH
Islander 40
Nautical 39
Nordic 40

References

Keelboats
1980s sailboat type designs
Sailing yachts
Sailboat type designs by C. Raymond Hunt Associates
Sailboat types built by O'Day Corp.
Sailboat types built by Cal Yachts